= Kiniye =

Coordinates: 15°46′N 74°25′E

Kinaye
- Village
- Interactive map of Kinaye
- Country: India
- State: Karnataka
- District: Belgaum

Languages
  - Official: Kannada
  - Local: Marathi
- Time zone: UTC+5:30 (IST)

Kiniye is a village in Belgaum district in Karnataka, India.
